GDP-fucose protein O-fucosyltransferase 2 (POFUT2) is an enzyme responsible for adding fucose sugars in O linkage to serine or threonine residues in Thrombospondin repeats.  The protein is an inverting glycosyltransferase, which means that the enzyme uses GDP-β-L-fucose as a donor substrate and transfers the fucose in O linkage to the protein producing fucose-α-O-serine/threonine.

Almost all glycosyltransferases reside in the Golgi apparatus.  However, POFUT2 as well as the related enzyme POFUT1 have recently been shown to reside in the endoplasmic reticulum.

The malaria parasite Plasmodium falciparum requires POFUT2 for efficient transmission to mosquitoes and infection of human liver cells.

References

External links
 

Transferases
EC 2.4.1